Iowa Yearly Meeting House-College Avenue Friends Church  is a historic church building located in Oskaloosa, Iowa, United States. The Colonial Revival structure was designed by Bloomington, Illinois architect A.T. Simmons, and completed in 1913. As their membership declined, Quakers in Iowa decided to concentrate on a few fundamental tenets of their faith, but gave way on their traditional concerns about simplicity and restraint. This more elaborate building replaced a simple 2½-story, brick and stone structure that was completed in 1865. The building project was a cooperative arraignment that included the Yearly Meeting, the Monthly Meeting, and nearby William Penn College. Oskaloosa had been chosen as the location of the Iowa Yearly Meeting, or the denominational headquarters, because of its central location to where the Quakers settled west of the Mississippi River. The previous building had separate meeting facilities for men and women, and this one does not. That separation was no longer considered necessary by the time this building was built. It was listed on the National Register of Historic Places in 1996.

See also
Whittier Friends Meeting House
Honey Creek Friends' Meetinghouse
Indiana Yearly Meeting

References

Quaker meeting houses in Iowa
Churches on the National Register of Historic Places in Iowa
Churches completed in 1913
Churches in Mahaska County, Iowa
National Register of Historic Places in Mahaska County, Iowa